Jazz Alive! A Night at the Half Note is a live album by saxophonists Zoot Sims, Al Cohn and Phil Woods recorded at the Half Note Club in 1959 and originally released on the United Artists label.

Reception

The AllMusic review by Ken Dryden states "Bop and cool fans will want to make any effort to hear this excellent release".

Track listing
 "Lover, Come Back to Me" (Sigmund Romberg, Oscar Hammerstein II) - 9:08
 "It Had to Be You" (Isham Jones, Gus Kahn) - 10:14
 "Wee Dot" (J. J. Johnson) - 8:50   
 "After You've Gone" (Turner Layton, Henry Creamer) - 11:37  
Recorded at the Half Note in NYC on February 6, 1959 (tracks 1 & 2) and February 7, 1959 (tracks 3 & 4)

Personnel 
Zoot Sims, Al Cohn - tenor saxophone
Phil Woods - alto saxophone (tracks 3 & 4)
Mose Allison - piano
Nabil "Knobby" Totah - bass
Paul Motian - drums

References 

1959 live albums
Al Cohn live albums
Zoot Sims live albums
Phil Woods live albums
United Artists Records live albums